The 2008-09 Hyundai A-League season was Melbourne Victory's fourth season. They finished top of the table at the end of the regular season and defeated Adelaide United in the Grand Final to take their second A-League title.

Season summary
The 2008–09 season brought the start of the A-League Youth League and the introduction of the W-League with Melbourne fielding teams in both competitions. Melbourne actively recruited, bringing in Socceroo Michael Thwaite on a one-year loan, Costa Rican World Cup player José Luis López, as well as Ney Fabiano from Asian Champions League rivals Chonburi FC.

Melbourne's season got off to an optimal start, winning the Pre-Season Challenge Cup. A 0–0 draw resulted in a penalty shoot-out, with Victory winning 8–7 on penalties against Wellington Phoenix.

After winning the pre-season cup, the Victory were held to a 0–0 draw away against Sydney FC. They reinforced their premiership favouritism by coasting to 4–2 and 5–0 victories against Wellington Phoenix and the Newcastle Jets respectively. Despite this, they succumbed 0–2 to an undermanned Sydney side at the Telstra Dome in front of 31,564 fans.

On 6 December 2008, Melbourne Victory became the first A-League club to amass total crowd figures of 1,000,000 after their away match against Perth Glory.

On 24 January 2009, Melbourne Victory won its final game of the season against Wellington Phoenix. The 2–0 win in front of 28,905 fans placed Victory ahead of Adelaide United on goals scored for the premiership title, a margin United failed to achieve in its 1–0 win over the Central Coast Mariners.

The Victory kicked off their finals campaign on 7 February 2009 in the major semi-final first leg against bitter rival Adelaide United at Hindmarsh Stadium, a game which was won courtesy of goals from Carlos Hernández and Danny Allsopp. In the second leg Melbourne defeated Adelaide United 4–0 with goals from Archie Thompson, Hernandez, Allsopp and Tom Pondeljak, granting Melbourne passage to the Grand Final on a 6–0 aggregate.

Adelaide then defeated Queensland Roar to set up a rematch with Melbourne in the Grand Final, which the Victory won 1–0 with Tom Pondeljak scoring in the 59th minute to regain the A-League Championship and becoming the first A-League team to win their second championship, a feat since achieved by Sydney FC and Brisbane Roar.

Players

First team squad

Transfers
In

* Steve Mautone is the current Melbourne Victory Goalkeeping coach and was named as the third choice goalkeeper for the AFC Champions League

Out

Matches

2008 Pre-Season Cup fixtures

2008-09 Hyundai A-League fixtures

2008-09 finals series

Statistics

Goals

A-League

Ladder

Finals series

2008–09 Awards
Victory Medal
Kevin Muscat and Danny Allsopp
Players' Player of the Year
Rodrigo Vargas
Clubman of the Year
Evan Berger
Golden Boot
Danny Allsopp
Women's Player of the Year
Brittany Timko
Youth Team Player of the Year
Matthew Theodore

W-League

2008–09 Westfield W-League fixtures

References

External links

 Melbourne – Official Website
 Pictures of Melbourne supporters
 MVFC – Melbourne Victory Videos

Melbourne Victory FC seasons
Melbourne Victory Season, 2008-09